Chern may refer to:
Shiing-Shen Chern (1911–2004), Chinese-American mathematician
Chern class, a type of characteristics class associated to complex vector bundles; named after Shiing-Shen Chern
Chern, Russia, several inhabited localities in Russia
Chern, medieval fortress on the modern location of Chernivtsi, Ukraine